Said Afandi al-Chirkawi (21 October 1937 – 28 August 2012) was a prominent scholar in Shafii mazhab and a spiritual master, or murshid. He was killed by a female suicide bomber on 28 August 2012.

Biography 
Al-Chirkawi was born in 1937 in the village of Chirkey, Buynaksky District, Republic of Dagestan. He was an Islamic scholar, a spiritual leader of Dagestani Muslims, and Sufi Shaykh of Naqshbandi and Shazali tariqahs. Tens of thousands of Muslims gather annually at Chirkey for brotherhood majlis — Mawlid celebrations — which were organised by Afandi. On 28 April 2012 more than 300,000 people from all over Russia and abroad were present at the annual gathering. 
Said Afandi was considered one of the Russia's top spiritual leaders whose tens of thousands of followers include influential officials, clerics and businessmen. His father died when Afandi was just seven years old. After high school he worked as shepherd to financially support his family. He served in the Soviet Army and worked as a firefighter at Chirkey Dam before beginning his religious education at the age of 32.

Publications 
Books and articles of Said Afandi are translated into Russian, Tatar and English languages.

Books in Russian language 
 Сокровищница благодатных знаний (Махачкала, 2010);
 История пророков, том 1 (Махачкала, 2009);
 Сборник выступлений шейха Саида Афанди аль-Чиркави (Махачкала, 2009)
 Современность глазами шейха Саида-Афанди (Махачкала, 2010);
 История пророков, том 2 (Махачкала, 2011);
 Побуждение внять призыву Корана, в 4 томах (Махачкала, 2007)

Books in Tatar language 
 Сокровищница благодатных знаний, перевод М. Ахматжанова (Казань, 2006)

Books in Avar language 
 Назмаби
 Къураналъул ахӀуде гӀавамал кантӀизари
 Къисасул анбияъ
 МажмугӀатуль фаваид

References

External links 
 Russian Биография Шейха Саида афанди аль-Чиркави
 Islam in Dagestan
 Biography of Shaykh Said Afandi al-Chirkawi
 Russian Site of Shaykh Said Afandi al-Chirkawi
 
 Follow Shaykh Said Afandi on Facebook

1937 births
2012 deaths
21st-century Muslim scholars of Islam
Russian imams
Russian Sufis
Russian Sufi religious leaders
Avar people
20th-century Islamic religious leaders
People from Buynaksky District
Assassinated Dagestanian people
Naqshbandi order
Sunni Sufis